The 2020 Tour de Luxembourg was the 80th edition of the Tour de Luxembourg road cycling stage race. It was held between 15 and 19 September, as part of the 2020 UCI Europe Tour and the 2020 UCI ProSeries.

Schedule

Teams
Eight UCI WorldTeams, twelve UCI ProTeams, and three UCI Continental teams made up the twenty-three teams that participated the race.

UCI WorldTeams

 
 
 
 
 
 
 
 

UCI ProTeams

 
 
 
 
 
 
 
 
 
 
 
 

UCI Continental Teams

Stages

Stage 1
15 September 2020 — Luxembourg City to Luxembourg City,

Stage 2
16 September 2020 — Remich to Hesperange,  

Riders held a protest during the opening kilometers of the stage to voice several of their safety concerns about the previous stage. They pointed out that there were parked vehicles, as well as a bus that was stopped on the road with under five kilometers to go. Lithuanian rider Ignatas Konovalovas of  had even found himself having to stop for a red light towards the end of that stage when the roads were opened back up  to traffic prematurely. Riders had spoken to race organizers about these hazards before stage 2, but when they encountered further problems on stage 2, they stopped. It was only after negotiations with race organizers and UCI did the riders agree to resume, but only after neutralizing the 80 kilometer route to Syren and only resume racing in the final 42 kilometers in the circuit around Hesperange.

Stage 3
17 September 2020 — Rosport to Schifflange,

Stage 4
18 September 2020 — Rodange to Differdange,

Stage 5
19 September 2020 — Mersch to Luxembourg City,

Classification leadership table

Final classification standings

General classification

Points classification

Mountains classification

Young rider classification

Teams classification

Notes

References

External links

Tour de Luxembourg
Tour de Luxembourg
Tour de Luxembourg
Tour de Luxembourg
Tour de Luxembourg